Allan Ides (born 1949) is an American lawyer, the Christopher N. May Professor in the Loyola Law School of Loyola Marymount University, Los Angeles, California and was a visiting professor at the University of Southern California, Gould School of Law, for Fall 2011. From 1989 through 1997, Ides was a faculty member at Washington and Lee University School of Law.

After graduating from Loyola Law School, Ides clerked for U.S. Supreme Court Justice Byron White from 1980 to 1981, and he argued for the defendant in the Supreme Court case United States v. Owens (484 US 554) on rules of evidence concerning memory-impaired witnesses.

Ides has co-authored Civil Procedure: Cases and Problems and Examples & Explanations:  Constitutional Law.

See also 
 List of law clerks of the Supreme Court of the United States (Seat 6)

References

1949 births
American legal scholars
Law clerks of the Supreme Court of the United States
Living people
Loyola Marymount University faculty
Washington and Lee University School of Law faculty